Gisenyi Airport is an airport in Rwanda. It has IATA airport code GYI (not to be confused with North Texas Regional Airport with FAA location identifier GYI).

Location
Gisenyi Airport , is located in Rwanda's Western Province, in Rubavu District, in the town of Gisenyi, at the International border with the Democratic Republic of the Congo. The geographic coordinates of this airport are:1° 40' 48.00"S, 29° 15' 30.00"E  (Latitude:-1.680000; Longitude:29.258334).

Overview
Gisenyi Airport is a medium-sized airport that serves the town of Gisenyi and the neighboring city of Goma, across the border in the Democratic Republic of the Congo. The two neighboring cities are also served by Goma Airport, which is very near the border with Rwanda - similar to Tijuana International Airport and Brown Field Municipal Airport which are separated by the United States - Mexico Border. Gisenyi Airport is one of the eight (8) public civilian airports under the administration of the Rwanda Civil Aviation Authority.

Airlines and destinations
RwandAir, the national carrier, operated a three weekly service between Gisenyi Airport and Kigali International Airport. However, as of June 2013 they no longer do so.

External links
 Location of Gisenyi Airport At Google Maps
Website of Rwanda Civil Aviation Authority

See also

 Gisenyi
 Rubavu District
 Rwanda Civil Aviation Authority

References

Western Province, Rwanda
Airports in Rwanda